Joseph (Ġużè) Aquilina (7 April 1911 – 8 August 1997) was a Maltese author and linguist born in Munxar.

Education
Aquilina graduated first as Bachelor of Arts and later as a lawyer from the University of Malta. Between 1937 and 1940 he read comparative semitic philology at the University of London where he obtained a doctorate.

In 1937 Ġużè Aquilina was appointed as the first profesor of Maltese and oriental languages at the University of Malta, where he contributed in a significant manner towards the study and strengthening of the Maltese language. It was only in 1934, three years before his appointment, that the Maltese language was declared the official language of Malta.

Career
Among the prominent posts which Aquilina held as a full-time professor at the University of Malta, was that as Dean of the Faculty of Arts.

Aquilina's numerous works include novels, philosophical essays, critical studies, drama, linguistic papers and religious books, his magnum opus being a Maltese–English Dictionary.

Partial bibliography 
 Teach Yourself Maltese. Teach Yourself Books, Hodder & Stoughton, London 1965; 6th impression 1985
 A Comparative Dictionary of Maltese Proverbs, 1972
 Papers in Maltese Linguistics. University of Malta
 A Survey of Contemporary Dialectal Maltese (jointly with B.S. Isserlin), Gozo/Leeds 1981
 Twemmin u Ħajja ["Faith and Life"], 1984
 Maltese–English Dictionary, I-II, Midsea Books Ltd, Malta, 1987–1990, 1,673 pages

See also

 List of essayists
 List of linguists
 List of Maltese people
 List of University of London people

External links
 allmalta article
 Biography in Maltese

Place of death missing
1911 births
1997 deaths
20th-century linguists
20th-century Maltese novelists
Alumni of the University of London
University of Malta alumni
Deans (academic)
English-language writers from Malta
Linguists from Malta
Male essayists
Maltese male novelists
Maltese essayists
Maltese lexicographers
People from Munxar
Academic staff of the University of Malta
20th-century essayists
Maltese academic administrators
20th-century male writers
20th-century lexicographers